Johannes Hermanus Addicks (4 January 1902 – 8 March 1961) was a Dutch chess player, Dutch Chess Championship silver medalist (1936).

Biography
Johannes Addicks was a member of the famous watchmaker family in Amsterdam. In the 1920s and 1930s he was one of the leading Dutch chess players, participant in several international chess tournaments held in the Netherlands.

In 1925, in simultaneous exhibition Johannes Addicks defeated the future world chess champion Alexander Alekhine.

Johannes Addicks played for Netherlands in the Chess Olympiad:
 In 1931, at fourth board in the 4th Chess Olympiad in Prague (+8, =4, -4).

References

External links

Johannes Addicks chess games at 365chess.com

1902 births
1961 deaths
Sportspeople from Amsterdam
Dutch chess players
Chess Olympiad competitors
20th-century chess players